Yury Malyshev (born 13 May 1933) is a Soviet speed skater. He competed in the men's 500 metres event at the 1960 Winter Olympics.

References

1933 births
Living people
Soviet male speed skaters
Olympic speed skaters of the Soviet Union
Speed skaters at the 1960 Winter Olympics
Place of birth missing (living people)